Milk tea refers to several forms of beverage found in many cultures, consisting of some combination of tea and milk. The term milk tea is used for both hot and cold drinks that can be combined with various kinds of milks and a variety of spices. This is a popular way to serve tea in many countries, and is the default type of tea in many South Asian countries. Beverages vary based on the amount of each of these key ingredients, the method of preparation, and the inclusion of other ingredients (varying from sugar or honey to salt or cardamom) Milk tea is the default type of tea in India and Pakistan and referred to as chai.

Variations 
Local variations include:
 British tea, served with milk
 Bubble tea, also known as pearl milk tea or boba milk tea, a Taiwanese tea-based drink invented in Taichung in the 1980s
 Burmese milk tea, called laphet yay (လက်ဖက်ရည်), made with strongly brewed black tea leaves, and sweetened with a customized ratio of condensed milk and evaporated milk, is popular in Myanmar. It is commonly served in tea shops, which first emerged during British rule in Burma.
 Cambric tea, a sweetened hot-milk beverage, often made with a small amount of tea
 Hong Kong-style milk tea, black tea sweetened with evaporated milk originating from the days of British colonial rule in Hong Kong
 Doodh pati chai, literally 'milk and tea leaves', a tea beverage drunk in India, Pakistan, Nepal, and Bangladesh
 Teh tarik, a kind of milk tea popular in Malaysia and Singapore
 Suutei tsai, a salty Mongolian milk tea
 Shahi haleeb, a Yemeni milk tea served after chewing qat
 Masala chai, also known as masala tea, is a spiced milk tea drunk in the Indian subcontinent
 Irani chai, a type of milk tea made with pure milk mixed with mawa, prepared in Iranian-style cafes in Hyderabad, India
 Thai tea, a sweet tea-based drink popular in Southeast Asia
 Dalgona milk tea, milk tea sweetened with traditional Korean dalgona, a honeycomb-like toffee

In Britain, when hot tea and cold milk are drunk together, the drink is simply known as tea due to the vast majority of tea being consumed in such a way. The term milk tea is unused, although one may specify tea with milk if context requires it. This may cause confusion for people from cultures that traditionally drink tea without milk

References

Further reading

External links
 

 
Non-alcoholic drinks
Milk-based drinks
Hong Kong inventions
Tea varieties

pl:Bawarka